The Australian, Windsor, Richmond, and Hawkesbury Advertiser was an English language newspaper published in Windsor, New South Wales.  It commenced publication in 1871, thirty years before the federation of Australia.

History
The newspaper was first published in 1871 before ceasing publication in 1899. The paper was published by printer, George Louis Asher Davies.

Digitisation
The surviving copies of the paper have been digitised as part of the Australian Newspapers Digitisation Program project hosted by the National Library of Australia.

See also
 List of newspapers in Australia
 List of newspapers in New South Wales

References

Further reading
 Holden, W Sprague 1961, Australia goes to press, Melbourne University Press, Melbourne.
 Mayer, Henry 1964, The press in Australia, Lansdowne Press, Melbourne.
 Walker, R B 1976, The newspaper press in New South Wales 1803-1920, Sydney University Press, Sydney.

External links

Defunct newspapers published in New South Wales
Windsor, New South Wales
Newspapers on Trove